Plica may refer to:
 Plica (lizard), a genus of lizards
 Capillaria plica, a parasitic nematode
 Plica (sigillography) - term from sigillography
 A fold or crease, especially of skin or other tissue, from medieval Latin plicare ("to fold")
Plica fimbriata: Fimbriated fold of tongue
 Plica semilunaris of the conjunctiva
 Plica semilunaris of the fauces
 Plica syndrome of the knee
 Plica circularis, also called circular fold, of the small intestine
 The hair disease Plica polonica: Polish plait
 In early music notation, a note indicated in a ligature